Battle Hymns MMXI is a re-recorded album released by the American heavy metal band Manowar in November 2010. It is a re-recording of their debut album Battle Hymns from 1982. It features the British actor Sir  Christopher Lee as narrator and the original Manowar drummer Donnie Hamzik. The songs had little changes from the originals, except that they are "louder and stronger". Some of them are extended versions of the originals and all are made with the help of modern technology, that wasn't available when the original album was released. In support of the album the band started their Battle Hymns Tour.

Track listing 

Tracks 11 - 14 only feature on a special edition of the album released on July 26, 2011. This version of the album was only available as part of the "MANOWAR Battle Pack UK", which also includes Metal Hammer's 25th Anniversary Special Manowar Edition, featuring the full story behind this new CD.

Personnel
Eric Adams - vocals
Karl Logan - guitars
Joey DeMaio - bass
Donnie Hamzik - drums

Additional personnel
Christopher Lee - narration on "Dark Avenger"
Ross "the Boss" Friedman - electric guitar Tracks 9 and 10

References 

2010 remix albums
Manowar albums